Afrotyphlops blanfordii, or Blanford's blind-snake, is a species of snake in the family Typhlopidae. The species is native to the Horn of Africa.

Geographic range

Etymology
The specific name, blanfordii, is in honour of English naturalist William Thomas Blanford.

Taxonomy
Afrotyphlops blanfordii is similar to Afrotyphlops lineolatus, and the two may even be conspecific.

Description
Dorsally, the body is olive-grey, with the basal half of each dorsal scale blackish. Ventrally, it has a narrow whitish strip running down the middle.

Habitat
The preferred natural habitats of A. blanfordii are grassland, shrubland, and forest.

Behaviour
Afrotyphlops blanfordii is fossorial and terrestrial.

Reproduction
Afrotyphlops blanfordii is oviparous.

References

Further reading
Boulenger GA (1889). "Descriptions of new Typhlopidæ in the British Museum". Annals and Magazine of Natural History, Sixth Series 4: 360–363. (Typhlops blanfordii, new species, p. 363).
Boulenger GA (1893). Catalogue of the Snakes in the British Museum (Natural History). Volume I. Containing the Families Typhlopidæ .... London: Trustees of the British Museum (Natural History). (Taylor and Francis, printers). xiii + 448 pp. + Plates I–XXVIII. (Typhlops blanfordii, p. 39 + Plate II, figures 5a–5c).
Broadley DG, Wallach V (2009). "A review of the eastern and southern African blind-snakes (Serpentes: Typhlopidae), excluding Letheobia Cope, with the description of two new genera and a new species". Zootaxa 2255: 1–100. (Afrotyphlops blanfordii, new combination, p. 34)
Largen MJ, Spawls S (2010). Amphibians and Reptiles of Ethiopia and Eritrea. Frankfurt am Main: Edition Chimaira / Serpents Tale. 694 pp. . 

blanfordii
Snakes of Africa
Vertebrates of Eritrea
Reptiles of Ethiopia
Reptiles described in 1899
Taxa named by George Albert Boulenger